Joseph Halot (born 1897, date of death unknown) was a Belgian tennis player. He competed at the 1920 Summer Olympics and the 1924 Summer Olympics.

References

External links
 

1897 births
Year of death missing
Belgian male tennis players
Olympic tennis players of Belgium
Tennis players at the 1920 Summer Olympics
Tennis players at the 1924 Summer Olympics
Place of birth missing